Arizona's 16th Legislative District is one of 30 in the state, covering portions of Maricopa and Pinal counties. As of 2021, there are 46 precincts in the district, 25 in Maricopa and 21 in Pinal, with a total registered voter population of 169,513. The district has an overall population of 253,114.

Political representation
The district is represented for the 2021–2022 Legislative Session in the State Senate by Kelly Townsend (R) and in the House of Representatives by Jacqueline Parker (R) and John Fillmore (R).

References

Maricopa County, Arizona
Pinal County, Arizona
Arizona legislative districts